Olifard is a surname. Notable people with the surname include:

 David Olifard (c.1113/1117 – c. 1170), Justiciar of the Lothians
 Walter Olifard (c. 1150–1222), Justiciar of the Lothians
 Walter Olifard (died 1242), Lord of Bothwell and Abernethy and Justiciar of Lothian

See also
 Oliphant (surname)